This is a list of hattricks in Allsvenskan since its inception in 1924–25. Hälsingborg's Knut Kroon and Halmstad's Tobie Svensson have scored the fastest hat-tricks in 3 minutes: Kroon against IFK Eskilstuna 21 October 1928 and Svensson against Gefle IF 28 October 1934.

Hat-tricks

References

Hat-tricks
Association football player non-biographical articles
Allsvenskan